Onychiurini is a tribe within the family Onychiuridae, a group of springtails.

Species 
The following genera are accepted within Bionychiurus:

 Absolonia Börner, 1901
 Argonychiurus Bagnall, 1949
 Bionychiurus Pomorski, RJ, 1996
 Deharvengiurus Weiner, WM, 1996
 Deuteraphorura Absolon, K, 1901
 Formosanonychiurus Weiner, 1986
 Leeonychiurus Sun, X & Arbea, J, 2014
 Ongulonychiurus Thibaud, J-M & Massoud, Z, 1986
 Onychiuroides Bagnall, 1948
 Onychiurus Gervais, 1841
 Orthonychiurus Stach, J, 1954
 Pilonychiurus Pomorski, RJ, 2007
 Similonychiurus Pomorski, RJ, 2007
 Uralaphorura Martynova, EF, 1978
 Vibronychiurus Pomorski, 1998

References 

Collembola
Animals described in 1906